Matthias Müller or Mueller may refer to:

 Matthias Müller (businessman) (born 1953), German manager at Volkswagen AG, and CEO of Porsche AG
 Matthias Müller (filmmaker) (born 1961), German experimental filmmaker and curator
 Matthias Müller (footballer) (born 1954), German footballer
 Matthias Müller (orienteer) (born 1982), Swiss orienteering competitor

See also
 Mathias Müller (born 1992), German field hockey player